Nadlistnik (in some sources Nadlisnik) is a former settlement in the Municipality of Kamnik in central Slovenia. It is now part of the village of Bela. The area is part of the traditional region of Upper Carniola. The municipality is now included in the Central Slovenia Statistical Region.

Geography

Name
Nadlisnik was attested in historical sources as Nadlisnickh and Nadlisnigk in 1488.

History
Nadlistnik was annexed by Bela in 1952, ending its existence as an independent settlement.

Notable people
Notable people that were born or lived in Nadlistnik include:
 (1848–1904), ethnologist and linguist

References

External links
Nadlistnik on Geopedia

Populated places in the Municipality of Kamnik
Former settlements in Slovenia